Bédien Morange (born in Paris and died in 1703 in Lyon), was a French theologian.

He was a doctor of Sorbonne. In 1660, he became canon and cantor of the Église Saint-Nizier (Lyon) and then was general vicar of the diocese. He devoted himself especially to refute the theory of Isaac de la Peyrère, who held that the Old Testament proves that there were men before Adam, and he wrote a catechism for his diocese, Summa universœ Theologiae Catéchistae. He was a member of the Compagnie du Saint-Sacrement.

The epistle Instructions pour les confesseurs by Jesuit Gaspard Loarte was dedicated to him.

Works
 Libri de preadamitis brevis Analysis, Lyon, Ant. Jullieron and Ant. Baret, 1656, in-16°.
 Primatus Lugdunensis Apologeticon, Lyon, Ant. Jullieron and Ant. Baret 1658, in 8°.
 Summa universœ Theologiae Catéchistae, Lyon, 1670, 4 vol. in-8°.

References

Academic staff of the University of Paris
1703 deaths
17th-century French Catholic theologians
Year of birth unknown